The men's 74 kg freestyle wrestling competitions at the 2014 Commonwealth Games in Glasgow, Scotland was held on 29 July at the Scottish Exhibition and Conference Centre.

Results
Legend
F — Won by fall
R — Retired

Final

Top half

Bottom half

Repechage

References

Wrestling at the 2014 Commonwealth Games